{{Speciesbox
| status = EN
| status_system = IUCN3.1
| status_ref = 
| taxon = Oxynoemacheilus mesudae
| authority = Erk'Akan<ref name = FB>{{cite web | url = http://www.fishbase.se/summary/Oxynoemacheilus-mesudae.html | title = Oxynoemacheilus mesudae Erk'akan, 2012 Isiki loach | accessdate = 2 January 2017 | publisher = Fishbase | editor1 = Rainer Froese | editor2 = Daniel Pauly | year = 2017}}</ref>
}} Oxynoemacheilus mersudae, the Isiki loach, is a species of stone loach from the genus Oxynoemacheilus. It is endemic to the Lake Isikli basin in central Anatolia, Turkey where it is known from four springs.Oxynoemacheilus mersudae'' was first formally described in 2012 by the Turkish biologist Füsun Erk'Akan and is named in honour of Erk’akan’s mother, Mesude Kaynak.

References

mesudae
Taxa named by Füsun Erk'akan
Fish described in 2007
Endemic fauna of Turkey